Joaquín Gorina is a town in Argentina, located in the La Plata Partido of Buenos Aires Province.

References

Populated places in Buenos Aires Province
La Plata Partido